Napoleon was crowned Emperor of the French on Sunday, December 2, 1804 (11 Frimaire, Year XIII according to the French Republican calendar), at Notre-Dame de Paris in Paris. It marked "the instantiation of [the] modern empire" and was a "transparently masterminded piece of modern propaganda".

Napoleon wanted to establish the legitimacy of his imperial reign, with its new dynasty and new nobility. To this end, he designed a new coronation ceremony unlike that for the kings of France, which had emphasized the king's consecration (sacre) and anointment and was conferred by the archbishop of Reims in Reims Cathedral. Napoleon's was a sacred ceremony held in the great cathedral of Notre Dame de Paris in the presence of Pope Pius VII.  Napoleon brought together various rites and customs, incorporating ceremonies of Carolingian tradition, the Ancien Régime and the French Revolution, all presented in sumptuous luxury.

On May 18, 1804, the Sénat conservateur vested the Republican government of the French First Republic in an emperor, and preparations for a coronation followed. Napoleon's elevation to emperor was overwhelmingly approved by the French citizens in the French constitutional referendum of 1804. Among Napoleon's motivations for being crowned were to gain prestige in international royalist and Catholic circles and to lay the foundation for a future dynasty.

Preparations

When Pope Pius VII agreed to come to Paris to officiate at Napoleon's coronation, it was initially established that it would follow the coronation liturgy in the Roman Pontifical. However, after the Pope's arrival, Napoleon persuaded the papal delegation to allow the introduction of several French elements in the rite  – such as the singing of the Veni Creator followed by the collect of Pentecost for the monarch's entrance procession, the use of Chrism instead of the Oil of Catechumens for the anointing (although the Roman anointing prayers were used), placing the sacred oil on the head and hands rather than the right arm and back of the neck, and the inclusion of several prayers and formulas from the coronations of French kings, to bless the regalia as it was delivered. In essence, French and Roman elements were combined into a new rite unique to the occasion. Also, the special rite composed ad hoc allowed Napoleon to remain mostly seated and not kneeling during the delivery of the regalia and during several other ceremonies, and reduced his acceptance of the oath demanded by the Church in the beginning of the liturgy to one word only.

Not wanting to be an Old Regime monarch, Napoleon explained: "To be a king is to inherit old ideas and genealogy. I don't want to descend from anyone."

Ceremony

According to Louis Constant Wairy, Napoleon awoke at 8:00 a.m. to the sound of a cannonade and left the Tuileries at 11:00 a.m. in a white velvet vest with gold embroidery and diamond buttons, a crimson velvet tunic and a short crimson coat with satin lining, a wreath of laurel on his brow. The number of onlookers, as estimated by Wairy, was between four and five thousand, many of whom had held their places all night through intermittent showers that cleared in the morning.

The ceremony started at 9:00 a.m. when the Papal procession set out from the Tuileries led by a bishop on a mule holding aloft the Papal crucifix. The Pope entered Notre Dame first, to the anthem Tu es Petrus, and took his seat on a throne near the high altar. Napoleon's and Joséphine's carriage was drawn by eight bay horses and escorted by grenadiers à cheval and gendarmes d'élite. (The ormolu fitting from the carriage was owned for several years by American preservationist Jim Williams. It is seen several times in the movie Midnight in the Garden of Good and Evil.) The two parts of the ceremony were held at different ends of Notre Dame to contrast its religious and secular facets. An unmanned balloon, ablaze with three thousand lights in an imperial crown pattern, was launched from the front of Notre Dame during the celebration.

Before entering Notre Dame, Napoleon was vested in a long white satin tunic embroidered in gold thread and Josephine similarly wore a white satin empire-style dress embroidered in gold thread.  During the coronation he was formally clothed in a heavy coronation mantle of crimson velvet lined with ermine; the velvet was covered with embroidered golden bees, drawn from the golden bees among the regalia that had been discovered in the Merovingian tomb of Childeric I, a symbol that looked beyond the Bourbon past and linked the new dynasty with the ancient Merovingians; the bee replaced the fleur-de-lis on imperial tapestries and garments. The mantle weighed at least eighty pounds and was supported by four dignitaries. Josephine was at the same time formally clothed in a similar crimson velvet mantle embroidered with bees in gold thread and lined with ermine, which was borne by Napoleon's three sisters. There were two orchestras with four choruses, numerous military bands playing heroic marches, and over three hundred musicians. A 400-voice choir performed Paisiello's "Mass" and "Te Deum". Because the traditional royal crown had been destroyed during the French Revolution, the so-called Crown of Napoleon, made to look medieval and called the "crown of Charlemagne" for the occasion, was waiting on the altar. While the crown was new, the sceptre was reputed to have belonged to Charles V and the sword to Philip III.
 
The coronation proper began with the singing of the hymn, Veni Creator Spiritus, followed by the versicle, "Lord, send forth your Spirit" and response, "And renew the face of the earth" and the collect for the Feast of Pentecost, "God, who has taught the hearts of your faithful by sending them the light of your Holy Spirit,..."  After this the prayer, "Almighty, everlasting God, the Creator of all..."  During the Litany of the Saints, the Emperor and Empress remained seated, only kneeling for special petitions.  The Emperor and Empress were both anointed on their heads and on both hands with chrismthe Emperor with the prayers, "God, the Son of God..." and "God who established Hazael over Syria...", the Empress with the prayer, "God the Father of eternal glory..." – while the antiphon Unxerunt Salomonem Sadoc Sacerdos... ("Zadok the priest...") was sung.  The Mass then began.  At Napoleon's request, the collect of the Blessed Virgin (as the patron of the cathedral) was said in place of the proper collect for the day.  After the epistle, the articles of the imperial regalia were individually blessed, and delivered to the Emperor and Empress.

The coronation of Napoleon and Josephine also differed in this respect from the pattern observed in other Western coronation rites: usually, in joint coronations of sovereign and consort, the sovereign is first anointed, invested with the regalia, crowned and enthroned, and only then is a similar but simplified rite of anointing, investiture, coronation and enthronement of the consort performed. However, for the Coronation of Napoleon and Josephine, each of those steps was performed jointly, so that Josephine was anointed immediately after Napoleon, and each item of regalia was delivered to her immediately after being given to him, a procedure that found no precedent either in the Roman Pontifical or in the French Ceremonial.

For the crowning, as recorded in the official procès-verbal of the Coronation the formula Coronet vos Deus..., a variation to the plural of the traditional French formula Coronet te Deus (God crown you with a crown of glory and righteousness...) – a formula that is also proper to the English Coronation rite –  was used exclusively, instead of the Roman formula Accipe coronam... (Receive the crown...). This differed to the usage of the French royal coronations, in which both formulas – the Roman Accipe coronam regni... and the Anglo-French Coronet te Deus... – were recited successively. While the Pope recited the above-mentioned formula, Napoleon turned and removed his laurel wreath and crowned himself and then crowned the kneeling Joséphine with a small crown surmounted by a cross, which he had first placed on his own head. The crowning formula was varied to use a plural form ("Coronet vos..." instead of "Coronet te..."), precisely because the Coronation of Josephine followed immediately after the assumption of the Crown by Napoleon. As for the omitted Roman formula Accipe coronam..., which depicted the monarch as receiving his crown from the Church, its use would have clashed with Napoleon's decision to crown himself. Historian J. David Markham, who also serves as head of the International Napoleonic Society, alleged in his book Napoleon For Dummies "Napoleon's detractors like to say that he snatched the crown from the Pope, or that this was an act of unbelievable arrogance, but neither of those charges holds water. The most likely explanation is that Napoleon was symbolizing that he was becoming emperor based on his own merits and the will of the people, and not in the name of a religious consecration. The Pope knew about this move from the beginning and had no objection (not that it would have mattered)." British historian Vincent Cronin wrote in his book Napoleon Bonaparte: An Intimate Biography "Napoleon told Pius that he would be placing the crown on his own head. Pius raised no objection." At Napoleon's enthronement the Pope said, "May God confirm you on this throne and may Christ give you to rule with him in his eternal kingdom".  Limited in his actions, Pius VII proclaimed further the Latin formula Vivat imperator in aeternum! ("May the Emperor live forever!"), which was echoed by the full choirs in a Vivat, followed by "Te Deum". After the Mass was finished, the Pope retired to the Sacristy, as he objected to presiding over or witnessing the civil oath that followed, due to its contents. With his hands on the Bible, Napoleon took the oath: I swear to maintain the integrity of the territory of the Republic, to respect and enforce respect for the Concordat and freedom of religion, equality of rights, political and civil liberty, the irrevocability of the sale of national lands; not to raise any tax except in virtue of the law; to maintain the institution of Legion of Honour and to govern in the sole interest, happiness and glory of the French people. The text was presented to Napoleon by the President of the Senate, the President of Legislature and the most senior President of the Council of State. After the oath the newly appointed herald of arms proclaimed loudly: "The thrice glorious and thrice august Emperor Napoleon is crowned and enthroned. Long live the Emperor!" During the people's acclamations Napoleon, surrounded by dignitaries, left the cathedral while the choir sang "Domine salvum fac imperatorem nostrum Napoleonem""God save our Emperor Napoleon".

After the coronation the Emperor presented the imperial standards to each of his regiments. According to government tallies, the entire cost was over 8.5 million francs.

In addition to David's paintings, a commemorative medal was struck with the reverse design by Antoine-Denis Chaudet.  In 2005, a digital depiction of the coronation was made by Vaughan Hart, Peter Hicks and Joe Robson for the "Nelson and Napoleon" Exhibition at the National Maritime Museum.

See also
Napoleon Tiara

Notes

References

Further reading

 Dwyer, Philip. "Citizen Emperor’: Political Ritual, Popular Sovereignty and the Coronation of Napoleon I,"  History (2015) 100#339 pp 40–57, online
Masson, Frederic; Cobb. Frederic (translator). Napoleon and his Coronation. London, 1911

1804 in France
Napoleon
First French Empire
Napoleon
1800s in Paris
Notre-Dame de Paris
December 1804 events